Edward Elliott Johnston (January 3, 1918 – February 18, 2011) was an American businessman and politician.

Raised in Jacksonville, Illinois, Johnston graduated from Illinois College and was a radio broadcaster. He served in the United States Air Force during World War II and the Korean War. He moved to Hawaii Territory and was in the insurance and tourism business. He was also involved with the Republican Party in Hawaii. President Dwight Eisenhower appointed Johnston secretary of the Hawaii Territory. In 1969, President Richard Nixon appointed Johnston High Commissioner of the Trust Territory of the Pacific Islands and served until 1976. He died in Rohnert Park, California.

Notes

1918 births
2011 deaths
Politicians from Jacksonville, Illinois
People from Rohnert Park, California
Illinois College alumni
Businesspeople from Hawaii
Hawaii Republicans
Territory of Hawaii officials
High Commissioners of the Trust Territory of the Pacific Islands
20th-century American businesspeople